Polecat Creek is a  long 4th order tributary to the Banister River in Halifax County, Virginia.

Course 
Polecat Creek rises at Vernon Hill, Virginia in Halifax County and then flows northeast to join the Banister River about 2 miles northwest of Halifax.

Watershed 
Polecat Creek drains  of area, receives about 45.6 in/year of precipitation, has a wetness index of 377.20, and is about 55% forested.

See also 
 List of Virginia Rivers

References 

Rivers of Halifax County, Virginia
Rivers of Virginia